Verrucariales is an order of ascomycetous fungi within the subclass Chaetothyriomycetidae of the class Eurotiomycetes. Although most of the Verrucariales are lichenised, the family Sarcopyreniaceae consists of 11 species of lichenicolous (lichen-dwelling) fungi.

Phylogenomic analysis suggests that the divergence between the lichenized Verrucariales and nonlichenized Chaetothyriales occurred about 131 million years ago.

Genera of uncertain placement
There are some genera in the Verrucariales that have not been placed with certainty into any family. These are:
Botryolepraria  – 2 spp.
Gemmaspora  – 1 sp.
Kalbiana  – 1 sp.
Merismatium  – 10 spp.

References

 
Ascomycota orders
Lichen orders
Taxa named by David Leslie Hawksworth